Helmut Leder (born 1963 in Bardenberg, Germany) is a Professor of Psychology at the Department of Basic Psychological Research and Research Methods, Faculty of Psychology of the University of Vienna, in Austria. He is currently Head of Department of Basic Psychological Research and Head of Cognitive Sciences Research Platform. He received his Degree in Psychology in 1990 from the RWTH Aachen University, and his PhD in Psychology in 1996 from University of Fribourg. His research within the field of experimental aesthetics has aimed to clarify the psychological processes involved in the appreciation of art and aesthetics. From 2014 until 2018 he was the president of the International Association of Empirical Aesthetics. In autumn 2018 he is a fellow of the Italian Academy at Columbia University.

Early career and research

From 1996 to 2007 Leder held diverse positions and was visiting researcher at several institutions, including the University of Stirling, the University of Fribourg, the Freie Universität Berlin, the Advanced Telecommunication Research Institute International, Kyoto, the University of Vienna, the University of Michigan (Ann Arbor), USC, Los Angeles and at UCSD, San Diego, California and CUNY N.Y and Swinburne University of Technology, Melbourne, he was Visiting Professor in Philosophy of Aesthetics at the Université Paris I - Panthéon-Sorbonne, Paris, France, Sept-Oct. 2017, in 2018, he was Visiting Professor at Keio University, Tokyo, and from September to December 208, Fellow of the Italian Academy of Advanced Studies of America, at Columbia University, New York.

His early research was focused on the perceptual processes that underlie the perception and recognition of human faces, especially the processing of configural and relational information. Within this general domain he developed a research line into the factors that contribute to the evaluation of facial attractiveness. Another of his main topics was the impact of design on valuation and usability, especially applied to car interiors and eyeglasses.

Current position and research
Since 2004 Leder is a Full Professor at the University of Vienna, and he has been the Head of the Department of Basic Psychological Research and Research Methods from 2004-2020. Since 2017 he is also Head of Cognitive Sciences Research Platform at University of Vienna.

In 2004 he also established the Research Focus on Psychological Aesthetics, the EVAL (Empirical visual Aesthetics research lab) through which, in addition to continuing his prior research lines, he has developed a broad research program on the psychology of aesthetics and the arts. This program was introduced as a cognitive model of the appreciation of art in a paper published in the British Journal of Psychology. This model has served to frame many studies on the cognitive foundations of art, neuroaesthetics, product design, and web design, among other fields. A citation analysis reveals that it is the most cited of all papers published in the British Journal of Psychology in 2004 and the second most cited since its publication He has research projects to study facial attractiveness, appreciation of art, the brain on art, and joint research projects with art history at University of Vienna (Prof. Rosenberg) and University of Applied Arts, Vienna. His team has also published a number of museum studies, in collaboration with the Museum Belvedere, the Musa, and the Albertina, with Galerie Raum mit Licht, Vienna, as well as with other international institutions. Part of his research was also featured in the 2018-19 Exhibition Beauty by Sagmeister & Walsh, first in the MAK in Vienna, later in Frankfurt and Hamburg.

Awards
Leder’s research record has been recognized with awards from some of the main professional associations in the domain of psychological aesthetics. In 2002 he received the Alexander-Gottlieb-Baumgarten-Award of the International Association of Empirical Aesthetics. In 2004 he received the Daniel E. Berlyne Award of the American Psychological Association (APA), Division 10: Society for the Psychology of Aesthetics Creativity and the Arts. In 2008 he was awarded with an International Fellowship of the International Association of Empirical Aesthetics. In 2020 h was warded Arnheim Award of the APA American Psychological Association, Div.10, for Outstanding Achievement in Psychology and the Arts.

Selected publications
 Leder, H. and Bruce, V. (2000). When inverted faces are recognized: The role of configural information in face recognition. Quarterly Journal of Experimental Psychology Section A-Human Experimental Psychology, 53: 513-536.
 Leder, H., Belke, B., Oeberst, A. and Augustin, D. (2004). A model of aesthetic appreciation and aesthetic judgements. British Journal of Psychology, 95: 489-508.
 Leder, H., Goller, J., Forster, M., Schlageter, L., & Paul, M. A. (2017). Face inversion increases attractiveness. Acta Psychologica, 178(July 2017), 25–31. DOI: 10.1016/j.actpsy.2017.05.005
 Pelowski, M., Markey, P., Lauring, J., & Leder, H. (2016). Visualizing the impact of art: An update and comparison of current psychological models of art experience. Frontiers in Human Neuroscience, 10, 160. doi: 10.3389/fnhum.2016.00160
 Leder, H. and Carbon, C. C. (2006). Face-specific configural processing of relational information. British Journal of Psychology, 97: 19-29.
Leder, H., & Nadal, M. (2014). Ten years of a model of aesthetic appreciation and aesthetic judgments: The aesthetic episode – Developments and challenges in empirical aesthetics. British Journal of Psychology. 443-464. DOI: 10.1111/bjop.1208.    
Pelowski, P., Markey, M., Forster, M., Gerger, G., & Leder, H. (2017). Move me, astonish me… delight my eyes and brain: The Vienna Integrated Model of top–down and bottom–up processes in Art Perception (VIMAP) and corresponding affective, evaluative, and neurophysiological correlates. Physics of Life Reviews.

References

External links
 Helmut Leder's homepage 

1963 births
Living people
German psychologists
RWTH Aachen University alumni
Cognitive psychologists
Emotion psychologists